Karakilisa (Turkish for "black church"; also spelled Gharakilisa) may refer to:
 Ağrı, Turkey (Known as Karakilisa before 1923)
Azatan, Armenia
 Gharibjanyan, Armenia
 Hartavan, Armenia
 Lernapar, Armenia
 Lerrnhovit, Armenia
 Sisian, Armenia
 Vanadzor, Armenia

See also
Karakilis
Karakilise (disambiguation)